Oh My English! is a Malaysian educational comedy series which debuted on 20 May 2012, on Astro TVIQ. The series ended on 17 December 2017.

Development 
The TV series is a collaboration between Astro and the Malaysian Ministry of Education as part of an initiative to improve the pronunciation of English among Malaysians, in line with the ministry's "Upholding Bahasa Malaysia, Strengthening English" or (MBMMBI) policy. Astro worked with the ministry since 2009 to publish world-class learning programs to schools throughout Malaysia through its Corporate Social Responsibility (CSR), Kampus Astro. This project has also equipped 10,000 schools in Malaysia with flat-screen television equipment, Astro decoders and 17 education and information channels including History channel, Discovery, National Geographic, Astro Tutor TV, Astro TVIQ and others.

Since 2018, there has been no plans or announcements to continue the series. Reruns of the old and current six seasons and it's telemovie specials are still shown on selected Astro channels and is available to watch on Astro On Demand.

Synopsis

Season 1 
A design school called SMK Ayer Dalam has a "3 Merah" class which is famous as a class that has a variety. No teacher wants to teach in this class because their students are known for their very naughty attitude, like to make noise and their worst academic results in the school. Their least favorite subject is English.

Finally, an English teacher named Henry Middleton (played by Zain Saidin) appeared. Henry's unique and encouraging way of teaching has been able to attract the attention and interest of students to learn English.

Season 2 
Mr. Middleton has changed his mind not to return to the UK. He continued his work in  Class 3 Merah, and learned more about his 'new home' country.

Season 3 
Oh My English see you again with the 3rd season! This season students travel outside the school grounds, moving into the future, and the past as well as tours outside Ayer Dalam. On episode 22, OME brings a special guest there is The Miz

Season 4 - Class of 2015 
Class 5 Merah will face the SPM examination. The relationship between Mr. Middleton and Cikgu Ayu are increasingly threatened due to the presence of new teachers. Taylor Marie Smith from America has participated in the student exchange program to SMK Ayer Dalam.

Season 5 - After School 
See Yew Soon has been kidnapped by a mysterious man who wants SYS to be his protégé. See Yew Soon needs help from Zack and Jibam. They are also accompanied by an A.I virtual watch that is Mia who often corrects their English.

Season 6 - Level Up! 
Class 3 Merah will receive some new teachers. Among them, Mr. James Blond (Mark Odea) is a confused and unassuming person. At the same time, he tried to win the hearts of the students but his intentions were often misunderstood and caused harm to himself. Zack (Juzzthin) and Jojie (Nadiya Nisaa) returned to SMK Ayer Dalam but now they are teachers. Ms. Jojie teaches Physical Education (PE) and Mr. Zack teaches Music Education.

Cast and characters

*Anusha and Mazlee only appears on promos (Season 5).

Episodes

Broadcast in Malaysia

Awards and nominations

Other related activities
The cast of Oh My English!, along with the collaboration of Liyana Jasmay, Altimet and Sleeq, also created a music video, "Together" in late 2012.

Oh My English! was nominated for the 2015 International Digital Emmy Awards in the Children & Young People category.

References 

Episode list using the default LineColor
Malaysian comedy television series
2012 Malaysian television series debuts
2017 Malaysian television series endings
2010s Malaysian television series